Ciupercenii Noi is a commune in Dolj County, Oltenia, Romania with a population of 5,899 people. It is composed of two villages, Ciupercenii Noi and Smârdan.

References

Communes in Dolj County
Localities in Oltenia